Neofriseria turkmeniella is a moth of the family Gelechiidae. It is found in the Uzbekistan, Turkmenistan, southern Kazakhstan and Tajikistan.

The larvae feed on Atraphaxis spinosa, Atraphaxis badghysi and Atraphaxis pyrifolia.

References

Moths described in 1987
Neofriseria